Gianina Elena Beleagă (born 21 May 1995) is a Romanian rower. She is twice world champion in the women's lightweight double sculls event winning back to back titles in 2017 and 2018 for Romania. She competed in the women's lightweight double sculls event at the 2016 Summer Olympics.

References

External links
 

1995 births
Living people
Romanian female rowers
Olympic rowers of Romania
Rowers at the 2016 Summer Olympics
Place of birth missing (living people)
World Rowing Championships medalists for Romania
Rowers at the 2020 Summer Olympics